
 
 

Hindmarsh Tiers (also known as The Tiers) is a locality in the Australian state of South Australia located about  south of the state capital of Adelaide  and about  north of the municipal seat of  Victor Harbor.  

Boundaries for the locality were created in August 1998 for the “long established name.”  A school operated from 1920 to 1938 within what is now the locality.

Hindmarsh Tiers Road which is maintained by the state government passes through the locality in an east-west alignment with the road forming part of its southern boundary. 

Land use within Hindmarsh Tiers is limited to “farming activities on large land holdings that do not pollute water resources” due to its location within  a watershed protection zone.   The protected area known as the Gum Tree Gully Conservation Park is located in the western side of the locality.

The 2016 Australian census which was conducted in August 2016 reports that Hindmarsh Tiers had 91 people living within its boundaries. 

Hindmarsh Tiers is located within the federal division of Mayo, the state electoral district of Finniss and the local government area of the City of Victor Harbor.

References

 
 
Fleurieu Peninsula